Jaelan Everett Phillips (born May 28, 1999) is an American football outside linebacker for the Miami Dolphins of the National Football League (NFL). 

Phillips played college football at UCLA for two seasons before medically retiring after 2018 due to sustaining several concussions and other injuries. He then studied music production at the Los Angeles City College before transferring to the Frost School of Music at the University of Miami in 2019, where he also returned to football and played for the Miami Hurricanes. Phillips was drafted by the Dolphins in the first round of the 2021 NFL Draft.

Early years,
Phillips was born in Redlands, California, on May 28, 1999, and attended Redlands East Valley High School, where he finished with 264 tackles, 31.5 sacks, three forced fumbles, and three interceptions. Considered the top high-school football prospect from the class of 2017, he received over 20 scholarship offers before committing to UCLA.

College career

As a true freshman in 2017, Phillips played in seven games and recorded 21 tackles (seven for loss), 2 pass deflections, and 3.5 sacks. As a sophomore in 2018, he played in four games before a concussion ended his season. After several other injuries, including being hit by a car while riding a moped, Phillips medically retired from football in December 2018 and enrolled at the Los Angeles City College to study music production.

In 2019, Phillips transferred to the Frost School of Music at the University of Miami with the intent to also play football for the Hurricanes. He sat out of the 2019 season due to NCAA transfer rules but started in 2020, finishing with 45 tackles, eight sacks, and an interception. He was named a second-team All-American and All-ACC and was considered a finalist for the Chuck Bednarik Award. He chose to forgo his remaining collegiate eligibility and enter the 2021 NFL Draft.

Professional career

Phillips was drafted by the Miami Dolphins in the first round (18th overall) of the 2021 NFL Draft. He signed his four-year rookie contract, worth $14 million, on June 9, 2021.

NFL career statistics

Regular Season

References

External links

Miami Dolphins bio
Miami Hurricanes bio
UCLA Bruins bio

1999 births
Living people
American football defensive ends
UCLA Bruins football players
Players of American football from California
Sportspeople from San Bernardino County, California
People from Redlands, California
Miami Hurricanes football players
Los Angeles City College alumni
Miami Dolphins players
University of Miami Frost School of Music alumni